José Duarte Piteira Rica Silvestre Cordeiro (born 23 February 1979) is a Portuguese economist and politician from the Socialist Party.

Political career 
He was appointed Minister of the Environment and Climate Action in the XXIII Constitutional Government of Portugal by António Costa in March 2022.

References 

1979 births
Living people
21st-century Portuguese politicians
Socialist Party (Portugal) politicians
Government ministers of Portugal
Environment ministers of Portugal
21st-century Portuguese economists